Apatema whalleyi is a moth of the family Autostichidae. It is found in Austria, Slovakia, the Czech Republic, Hungary, Romania and on Crete.

The wingspan is about 10 mm.

References

Moths described in 1965
Apatema
Moths of Europe